Gising-gising, also known as ginataang sigarilyas, is a spicy Filipino vegetable soup or stew originating from the provinces of Nueva Ecija and Pampanga in the Philippines. It is traditionally made with chopped winged beans (sigarillas or sigarilyas), and coconut milk spiced with labuyo chili, garlic, onions, and bagoong alamang (shrimp paste). The name literally means "wake up, wake up". It can be eaten alone, on top of rice, or as a side dish to grilled meat dishes. It is a type of ginataan.

Description
The basic ingredient of gising-gising is winged beans chopped finely or into diagonal  strips. They are cooked in coconut milk with garlic, ginger, onions, bagoong alamang (shrimp paste), and siling haba and labuyo peppers. The dish also commonly includes ground meat (usually pork), ground shrimp, or shredded tinapa (smoked fish).

Variations
Winged beans can also be substituted with chopped yardlong beans or water spinach (kangkong). The dish can also be cooked with other seafood like squid and can include other vegetables and spices. The shrimp paste can also be replaced with commercial bouillon cubes or meat or seafood stock.

A variant of the dish using calabaza is ginataang sigarilyas at kalabasa which can also be treated as a variant of ginataang kalabasa.

Similar dishes
Gising-gising is very similar to the Bicolano dish Bicol Express in terms of ingredients, to the point that spicier versions of gising-gising are sometimes referred to as "Sigarilyas Express".

See also
Bicol Express
Laing (food)
Ginataang ampalaya

References

Philippine soups
Vegetable dishes
Vegetable soups